The 2023 Special Olympics World Summer Games, also Special Olympics World Games Berlin 2023, will be the 16th Special Olympics, being held in Berlin, Germany. It will mark the first time that Germany has hosted the Special Olympics World Games. The Special Olympics will last eight days, starting from 17 June to 25 June 2023. There will be about 7,000 athletes and Unified partners from approximately 170 countries to compete in 24 sports, with 3,000 coaches and 20,000 volunteers.

Host selection
The bid process opened in November 2017. Germany was the only country that was interested of hosting the games after previously withdrawn their 2019 bid. Berlin, Germany was selected as the host city on 13 November 2018 at the Global Athlete Congress in Santo Domingo, Dominican Republic. On 30 January 2020, Berlin was officially confirmed as the host city for the games.

Ceremonies

Opening ceremony
The opening ceremony will take place at the Olympiastadion on 17 June 2023.

Closing ceremony
The closing ceremony will be held in the Straße des 17. Juni on 25 June 2023.

Venues

Events will be held in fifteen venues:
Messe Berlin
Olympiapark Berlin
Straße des 17. Juni
Wannsee
Friedrich-Ludwig-Jahn-Sportpark
Mommsenstadion
Velodrom
Bowlingcenter Schillerpark
Poststadion
Max-Schmeling-Halle
Horst-Korber-Sportzentrum
Sportforum Hohenschönhausen
Kupfergraben (Spree)
SSE (Swimming and Diving Hall)
Steffi-Graf-Stadion

Sports

The following competitions are scheduled to place:

Participating nations

Marketing

Logo, branding and slogan

The logo and slogan were unveiled on December 14, 2021, at the Sky Deutschland studio. The emblem, which brings together cheerful colors and iconic images of Berlin, was designed with the help of Special Olympics athletes. During a workshop, they shared their thoughts and feelings about the Games and inclusion. The list of feelings participants chose to be incorporated in the logo, which are represented by fun shapes and the five main logo colors, are joy, togetherness, excitement, pride and passion. Additionally, iconic symbols of Berlin are used to welcome athletes and visitors to the city. The Berlin Bear, in green, can be found on the city's coat of arms. Logo designers also felt it was important to honor Berlin's ability to overcome a past of separation and isolation after the city was divided at the end of World War II. The Brandenburg Gate, in red, and Fernsehturm Tower, in fushia, celebrate a unified city and Berlin as the capital of one Germany. Overall, the logo was created to evoke a sense of unity, diversity, playfulness and connection. The slogan #UnbeatableTogether or in German #ZusammenUnschlagbar represents Togetherness and overcoming borders collectively are main elements of the logo.

References

External links
 Official website

Special Olympics World Summer Games
Special Olympics
2023 in German sport
Special Olympics
Special Olympics
International sports competitions hosted by Germany
Multi-sport events in Germany
Sports competitions in Berlin